The 1964 Japan Series was the Nippon Professional Baseball (NPB) championship series for the 1964 season. It was the 15th Japan Series and featured the Pacific League champions, the Nankai Hawks, against the Central League champions, the Hanshin Tigers.  It would take 21 years for the Tigers to return to the Japan Series, and in Nankai's case, 35 years and an ownership change.

Summary

Matchups

Game 1
Thursday, October 1, 1964 – 7:01 pm at Koshien Stadium in Nishinomiya, Hyōgo Prefecture

Game 2
Friday, October 2, 1964 – 7:00 pm at Koshien Stadium in Nishinomiya, Hyōgo Prefecture

Game 3
Sunday, October 4, 1964 – 6:59 pm at Osaka Stadium in Osaka, Osaka Prefecture

Game 4
Monday, October 5, 1964 – 7:00 pm at Osaka Stadium in Osaka, Osaka Prefecture

Game 5
Tuesday, October 6, 1964 – 7:00 pm at Osaka Stadium in Osaka, Osaka Prefecture

Game 6
Friday, October 9, 1964 – 6:59 pm at Koshien Stadium in Nishinomiya, Hyōgo Prefecture

Game 7
Saturday, October 10, 1964 – 6:59 pm at Koshien Stadium in Nishinomiya, Hyōgo Prefecture

See also
1964 World Series

References

Japan Series
Japan Series
Japan Series